Events in the year 1898 in music.

Specific locations
1898 in Norwegian music

Events
Otilie Dvořáková, daughter of Antonín Dvořák, marries her father's pupil, composer Josef Suk.
Dame Marie Tempest marries the actor-playwright Cosmo Stuart, grandson of the Duke of Richmond.

Published popular music

 "Because" w. Charles Horwitz m. Frederick V. Bowers
 "The Boy Guessed Right" w.m. Lionel Monckton
 "Ciribiribin" w. Carlo Tiochet m. Alberto Pestalozza
 "Gold Will Buy Most Anything But A True Girl's Heart" w. Charles E. Foreman m. Monroe H. Rosenfeld
 "Good-bye Dolly Gray" w. Will D. Cobb m. Paul Barnes
 "Goodnight, Little Girl, Goodnight" w. Julai M. Hays m. J. C. Macy
 "Gypsy Love Song" w. Harry  B. Smith m. Victor Herbert from the musical The Fortune Teller
 "Honey on my Lips" Charles E. Trevathan
 "I Guess I'll Have To Telegraph My Baby" w.m. George M. Cohan
 "Just As The Sun Went Down" w. Karl Kennett m. Lyn Udall
 "Just One Girl" w. Karl Kennett m. Lyn Udall
 "Kiss Me Honey Do" w.  Edgar Smith m. John Stromberg
 "The Lily Of Laguna" w.m. Leslie Stuart
 "'Mid The Green Fields Of Virginia" w.m. Charles K. Harris
 "Mister Johnson Don't Get Gay" w.m. Dave Reed Jr
 "The Moth And The Flame" w. George Taggart m. Max S. Witt
 "My Old New Hampshire Home" w. Andrew B. Sterling m. Harry Von Tilzer
 "Recessional" w. Rudyard Kipling m. Reginald De Koven
 "Romany Life" w. Harry B. Smith m. Victor Herbert
 "The Rosary" w. Robert Cameron Rogers m. Ethelbert Nevin
 "Salome" m. William Lorraine
 "She is the Belle of New York" w. Hugh Morton m. Gustave Kerker
 "She Was Bred In Old Kentucky" w. Harry Braisted m. Stanley Carter
 "Swipsy Cakewalk" (for piano) c. Scott Joplin
 "When You Were Sweet Sixteen" w.m. James Thornton
 "Who Dat Say Chicken In Dis Crowd" w. Paul Lawrence Dunbar m. Will Marion

Christmas songs
 "Nu tändas tusen juleljus", by Emmy Köhler

Recorded popular music

 "The Amorous Goldfish" (w. Harry Greenbank m. Sidney Jones)  –  Syria Lamonte on Berliner Gramophone
 "At A Georgia Camp Meeting" (w.m. Kerry Mills)  –  Sousa's Band on Berliner Gramophone – Dan W. Quinn on Columbia Records
 "The Battle Cry Of Freedom" (w.m. George Frederick Root)  –  John Terrell on Berliner Gramophone
 "Believe Me, If All Those Endearing Young Charms" (w. Thomas Moore m. trad)  –  J. W. Myers on Berliner Gramophone
 "Break The News To Mother" (w.m. Charles K. Harris)  –  George J. Gaskin on Edison Records
 "Chin, Chin, Chinaman" (w. Harry Greenbank m. Sidney Jones)  –  James T. Powers on Berliner Gramophone
 "Cotton Blossoms" (m. M. H. Hall)  –  Sousa's Band on Berliner Gramophone
 "Don Jose Of Sevilla" (Smith, Herbert)  –  Jessie Bartlett Davis & W. H. MacDonald on Berliner Gramophone
 "Happy Days In Dixie" (m. Kerry Mills)  –  Arthur Collins on Edison Records
 "The Harp That Once Thro' Tara's Halls" (w. Thomas Moore m. trad)  –  J. W. Myers on Berliner Gramophone
 "A Hot Time In The Old Town" (w. Joe Hayden m. Theodore A. Metz)  –  Sousa's Band on Berliner Gramophone-  Len Spencer with banjo Vess L. Ossman on Columbia Records –  Roger Harding on Edison Records
 "In The Gloaming" (w. Meta Orred m. Annie Fortescue Harrison)  –  Roger Harding on Berliner Gramophone
 "I'se Gwine Back To Dixie" (w.m. C. A. White)  –  Edison Male Quartette on Edison Records
 "Just Before The Battle, Mother" (w.m. George Frederick Root)  –  Frank C. Stanley on Edison Records
 "Killarney" (w. Edmund Falconer m. Michael William Balfe)  –  Arthur Gladstone on Berliner Gramophone
 "Largo Al Factotum" (w. Cesare Sterbini m. Giaocchino Rossini)  –  Alberto Del Campo on Berliner Gramophone
 "Love's Old Sweet Song" (w. George Clifton Bingham m. James Lyman Molloy)  –  Annie Carter on Berliner Gramophone
 "The Miner's Dream Of Home" (w.m. Will Godwin & Leo Dryden)  –  Leo Dryden on Berliner Gramophone
 "Mister Johnson Don't Get Gay" (w.m. Dave Reed Jr)  –  Press Eldridge on Edison Records
 "Mister Johnson, Turn Me Loose" (w.m. Ben Harney)  –  Marguerite Newton on Edison Records –  Len Spencer with  Vess L. Ossman on Columbia Records
 "My Old Kentucky Home, Good Night" (w. m. Stephen Collins Foster)  –  Diamond Four on Berliner Gramophone –  Edison Male Quartette on Edison Records
 "Oh, Promise Me" (w. Clement Scott m. Reginald DeKoven)  –  Jessie Bartlett Davis on Berliner Gramophone
 "Old Folks At Home" (w. m. Stephen Collins Foster)  –  Diamond Four on Berliner Gramophone
 "On The Banks Of The Wabash Far Away" (w.m. Paul Dresser)  –  Annie Carter on Berliner Gramophone
 "Orange Blossoms" (m. Arthur Pryor)  –  Sousa's Band on Berliner Gramophone
 "The Palms" (m. Gabriel Fauré)  –  Diamond Four on Berliner Gramophone
 "Rocked In The Cradle Of The Deep" (w. Mrs Emma Hart Willard m. Joseph Phillip Knight)  –  William Hooley on Edison Records
"She Never Did the Same Thing Twice"  – Dan W. Quinn on Berliner Gramophone
 "She Was Bred In Old Kentucky" (w. Harry Braisted m. Stanley Carter)  –  Albert C. Campbell on Edison Records
"She was Happy Til She Met You"  – Dan W. Quinn on Columbia Records
 "Smoky Mokes" (m. Abe Holzmann)  –  banjo Vess L. Ossman on Columbia Records
 "Stars And Stripes Forever" (m. John Philip Sousa)  –  Sousa's Band on Berliner Gramophone
 "Sweet And Low" (w. Alfred, Lord Tennyson m. Sir Joseph Barnby)  –  Ladies Brass Quartette of Boston Fadettes on Berliner Gramophone
 "Sweet Genevieve" (w. George Cooper m. Henry Tucker)  –  Jessie Bartlett Davis on Berliner Gramophone
 "Sweet Rosie O'Grady" (w.m. Maude Nugent)  –  Steve Porter on Berliner Gramophone
 "The Sweetest Story Ever Told" (w.m. R. M. Stults)  –  Diamond Four on Berliner Gramophone –  George J. Gaskin on Edison Records
 "Then You'll Remember Me" (w. Alfred Bunn m. Michael William Balfe)  –  James Norrie on Berliner Gramophone-  Annie Carter on Berliner Gramophone
 "There's A Little Star Shining For You" (w.m. James Thornton)  –  Dan W. Quinn on Edison Records
 "The Thunderer" (m. John Philip Sousa)  –  Sousa's Band on Berliner Gramophone
 "Tramp, Tramp, Tramp" (w.m. George Frederick Root)  –  Frank C. Stanley on Edison Records
 "When Johnny Comes Marching Home" (w.m. Louis Lambert)  –  Frank C. Stanley on Edison Records
 "Yankee Doodle" (trad)  –  Frank C. Stanley on Edison Records

Classical music
Ernest Chausson – String Quartet (completed posthumously)
Samuel Coleridge-Taylor 
Hiawatha's Wedding Feast, Op.30
Ballade, Op.33 (premiered September 12 in Gloucester)
African Suite for piano, Op.35
Edward Elgar – Caractacus
George Enescu
Trois melodies sur poèmes de Jules Lemaitre et Sully Prudhomme, for bass and piano, Op. 4
Variations for Two Pianos on an Original Theme in A♭ major, for piano, Op. 5
Sonata in F minor, for cello and piano, Op. 26, No. 1
Gabriel Fauré
Fantaisie, Op. 79
Pelléas et Mélisande, Op. 80
Alexander Glazunov – Ruses d'Amour (ballet)
Paul Juon – Sonata for Violin and Piano no. 1 in A major
Carl Nielsen – String Quartet No. 3 in E flat major
Henryk Melcer-Szczawiński – Piano Concerto No. 2 in C minor
Henrique Oswald
Cello Sonata No. 1 in D minor, Op. 21
Piano Quartet No. 2 in G major, Op. 26
Camille Saint-Saëns – Barcarolle in F major
Christian Sinding – Concerto for Violin in A majorOpera
Antônio Francisco Braga – JupyraSamuel Coleridge-Taylor – The GitanosUmberto Giordano – FedoraIvar Hallstrom – Little KarinPietro Mascagni – IrisEmile Pessard – La dame de trèfle premiered on May 13 at the Bouffes-Parisiens, Salle Choiseul, Paris
Nikolai Rimsky-KorsakovBoyarinya Vera ShelogaSadko, premiered January 7 at the Solodovnikov Theatre in Moscow.

Musical theater
 The Belle of New York London production
 The Bride Elect Broadway production
 The Fortune Teller Toronto and London productions
 A Greek Slave London production
 Hurly-Burly Broadway production
 A Runaway Girl London and Broadway productions
 The Skirt Dancer London production
 Véronique (operetta)'' (André Messager) – Paris production

Births
January 9 – Gracie Fields, singer and actress
January 28 – Vittorio Rieti, composer
February 3 – Lil Hardin Armstrong, wife and musical collaborator of Louis Armstrong
February 7 – Dock Boggs, banjo player
February 12 – Roy Harris, composer
February 15 – Totò, actor and composer
February 28 – Molly Picon, Broadway star
March 4 – Robert Schmertz, American folk musician and architect (d. 1975)
April 3 – George Jessel, American actor, singer & songwriter
April 9 – Paul Robeson, singer
May 14 – Zutty Singleton, jazz drummer
May 15 – Arletty, actress and singer
May 26 – Ernst Bacon, pianist and composer (d. 1990)
May 28 – Andy Kirk, jazz musician
June 6 – Ninette de Valois, founder of the UK's Royal Ballet
June 29 – Yvonne Lefébure, French pianist
July 4 – Gertrude Lawrence, English actress, singer and dancer
July 6 – Hanns Eisler, composer
July 15 – Noel Gay, English songwriter
August 2 – Anthony Franchini, Italian-born guitarist
August 15 – Charles Tobias, US songwriter and singer
August 24 – Fred Rose, songwriter, music publisher
September 1
Marilyn Miller, US actress, singer and dancer
Violet Carson, actress, singer and pianist
September 26 – George Gershwin, US composer
September 27 – Vincent Youmans, US composer
October 7 – Alfred Wallenstein, US cellist and conductor
October 8 – Clarence Williams, US jazz pianist and composer
October 18 – Lotte Lenya, singer and actress, wife of Kurt Weill
November 1 – Sippie Wallace, blues singer
December 3 (n.s.) – Lev Knipper, Russian composer (and NKVD agent)
December 5 – Grace Moore, operatic soprano
December 14 – Lillian Randolph, actress and singer
December 24 – Baby Dodds, jazz drummer

Deaths
January 7 – Heinrich Lichner, composer, 68
January 8 – Alexandre Dubuque, composer, 85
January 16 – Antoine François Marmontel, pianist and teacher, 81
February 15 – Franz Behr, composer (b. 1837)
March 11 – Tigran Chukhajian, conductor and composer, founder of the first opera institution in the Ottoman Empire, 60
March 15 – Julius Schulhoff, pianist and composer, 72
March 28 – Anton Seidl, conductor, 47
April 21 – Théodore Gouvy, composer, 78
May 15 – Ede Reményi, violinist, 70
May 16 – Jean Antoine Zinnen, composer of the Luxembourg national anthem, 71
August 17 – Karl Zeller, Austrian composer, 56 (pneumonia)
August 21 – Niccolò van Westerhout, composer, 40 (peritonitis)
September 9 – William Chatterton Dix, hymn-writer, 61
September 11 – Adolphe Samuel, Belgian composer, 74
November 7 – Max Alvary, operatic tenor, 42
December 13 – George Frederick Bristow, composer, 72
December 29 – Georg Goltermann, cellist and composer, 74

References

See also
 1898
 list of years in music

 
19th century in music
Music by year